Tarku may refer to:
Tarku, India
Tarku, Nepal
Tarku, another name for Tarki in Russian Daghestan